Mango-Seffner was a Census-designated place in Hillsborough County, Florida during the 1980 United States Census, which consists of the communities of Mango and Seffner. The population in 1980 was 6,493. The census area split to form Mango and Seffner CDPs in 1990, when the population recorded were 8,700 & 5,371 respectively.

Geography
The census area of Mango-Seffner was located at approximately 27.97971 north, 82.297382 west. The census area was located east of East Lake-Orient Park and north of Brandon. The CDP had a land area of 4.5 square miles (11.7 square kilometers).

References

Geography of Hillsborough County, Florida
Former census-designated places in Hillsborough County, Florida
Former census-designated places in Florida